This is a list of 256 genera in the tribe Tingini.

Tingini genera

References

Articles created by Qbugbot